Tabea Rößner (born 7 December 1966) is a German journalist and  politician of Alliance 90/The Greens who has been serving as a member of the Bundestag since 2009. In 2019, she unsuccessfully ran as the Green Party's candidate for Mayor of Mainz.

Early life and career
Rößner was born in Sassenberg. She became a member of the Greens in 1986 and studied musicology, art history and media studies at the University of Cologne and the Goethe University Frankfurt. During her studies, she completed an internship with New York-based composer Andrew Culver in 1989.

From 1991 until 2009, Rößner worked as a freelance journalist for Hessischer Rundfunk, RTL and ZDF.

Political career
From 2001 until 2006, Rößner served as co-chair of the Green Party in Rhineland-Palatinate, alongside Manfred Seibel.

Rößner has been a member of the German Bundestag since the 2009 federal election, representing Mainz. She first served on the Committee on Cultural Affairs and Media from 2009 until 2017 before moving to the Committee on Legal Affairs and Consumer Protection following the 2017 elections. She was her parliamentary group's rapporteur on public broadcasting. Since the 2021 elections, Rößner has been chairing the Committee on Digitization.<ref>Neue Rolle für Hofreiter? Grüne nominieren Vorsitzende für Bundestagsausschüsse RedaktionsNetzwerk Deutschland’', 9 December 2021.</ref>

In addition to her committee assignments, Rößner is a member of the Parliamentary Friendship Group for Relations with the States of Central Asia (Kazakhstan, Kyrgyzstan, Uzbekistan, Tadjikistan, Turkmenistan) and the Parliamentary Friendship Group for Relations with the States of South Asia (Afghanistan, Bangladesh, Bhutan, Maldives, Nepal, Pakistan, and Sri Lanka). She has also been a substitute member of the German delegation to the Parliamentary Assembly of the Council of Europe (PACE) since 2018, where she serves on the Committee on Culture, Science, Education and Media and the Sub-Committee on Culture, Diversity and Heritage.

In the negotiations to form a so-called traffic light coalition of the Social Democratic Party (SPD), the Green Party and the Free Democratic Party (FDP) on the national level following the 2021 German elections, Rößner was part of her party's delegation in the working group on cultural affairs and media policy, co-chaired by Carsten Brosda, Claudia Roth and Otto Fricke.

Other activities
Corporate boards
 Mainzer Stadtwerke, Member of the Supervisory Board
Non-profit organizations
 German-Israeli Health Forum for Artificial Intelligence (GIHF-AI), Member of the Board of Trustees (since 2022)
 Antenne Mainz'', Member of the Broadcasting Council
 Federal Network Agency for Electricity, Gas, Telecommunications, Post and Railway (BNetzA), Member of the Advisory Board
 Haus der Geschichte, Member of the Board of Trustees (since 2009)
 German Federation for the Environment and Nature Conservation (BUND), Member
 Greenpeace, Member
 German United Services Trade Union (ver.di), Member

Personal life
Rößner is married to media lawyer Karl-Eberhard Hain and has two children from a previous relationship.

References

External links 
Personal website

Members of the Bundestag for Rhineland-Palatinate
People from Warendorf (district)
University of Cologne alumni
Goethe University Frankfurt alumni
Living people
1966 births
Members of the Bundestag 2021–2025
Members of the Bundestag 2017–2021
Members of the Bundestag 2013–2017
Members of the Bundestag 2009–2013
Members of the Bundestag for Alliance 90/The Greens